Harald Pinxten (born 1 September 1977 in Neerpelt) is a Belgian retired professional football player.

External links
 Career summary by playerhistory.com
 

1977 births
Living people
Belgian footballers
Belgian expatriate footballers
People from Neerpelt
Association football defenders
Belgian Pro League players
Challenger Pro League players
Scottish Premier League players
Royal Antwerp F.C. players
Livingston F.C. players
Belgian expatriate sportspeople in Scotland
Expatriate footballers in Scotland
Footballers from Limburg (Belgium)